Calcium Lime Rust, more commonly known as CLR, is a household cleaning product used for dissolving stains, such as calcium, lime, and iron oxide deposits.

Its ingredients may include various compounds:
water
lactic acid
gluconic acid
lauramine oxide
propylene glycol
n-butyl ether
glycolic acid
sulfamic acid
disodium capryloamphodipropionate
ethylene glycol n-butyl ether
citric acid

One formulation is (by weight) lactic acid 12-18%, gluconic acid 2.50-3.75%, lauramine oxide 1.50-3.25%, with the remainder being water. The product also contained phosphoric acid at one time, but it is now phosphate-free.

Mechanism of action 

Weak acids can dissolve calcium deposits and rust without damaging the surrounding metals and plastics.

See also 
List of cleaning agents

References

External links
 CLR Manufacturer's Website

Cleaning products